Hypoxia-inducible factor 1-alpha inhibitor is a protein that in humans is encoded by the HIF1AN gene.

Interactions 

HIF1AN has been shown to interact with HIF1A and Von Hippel-Lindau tumor suppressor. Additionally, asparaginyl hydroxylation of HIF1α by FIH-1 (HIF1AN) at N803 impairs its interaction with CBP/P300.

References

Further reading